Puyhuanccocha (possibly from Quechua puywan heart of an animal, qucha lake, "heart lake") is a mountain in the Raura mountain range in the Andes of Peru. It is located in the boundary of the regions of Huánuco and Pasco.

It is located south of Lake Tinquicocha.

References

Mountains of Peru
Mountains of Huánuco Region
Mountains of Pasco Region
Lakes of Peru
Lakes of Huánuco Region